{{speciesbox
|image = Amaryllis carrascoi.png
|image_caption =AM P.73747<ref name=am>{{cite web|url=https://www.gbif.org/occurrence/1100784281|title=GBIF: Amaryllis carrascoi Lowry & Stoddart, 2002. (AM P.73747)|access-date=2022-11-04}}</ref>
|genus=Amaryllis (crustacean)
|species= carrascoi
|authority = Lowry & Stoddart, 2002
}}Amaryllis carrascoi'' is a species of crustacean in the family Amaryllididae, and was first described in 2002 by James K. Lowry and Helen E. Stoddart.

It is found on the southern coastlines of Australia, from Botany Bay, New South Wales to King George Sound, Western Australia, in sublittoral zones and generally in shallow water (1 - 30 m depth), and in association with algae, sea grasses and bryozoans or on sands.

References

External links
 Amaryllis carrascoi images & occurrence data from GBIF

Crustaceans described in 2002
Taxa named by James K. Lowry
Amphipoda